Al Madina Al Monawara Sporting Club, is an Egyptian football club based in Luxor, Egypt. The club is currently playing in the Egyptian Second Division, the second-highest league in the Egyptian football league system.

Egyptian Second Division
Football clubs in Egypt
1977 establishments in Egypt
Association football clubs established in 1977